Mateusz Piechowski (born 1 March 1995) is a Polish handball player who plays for Dinamo Viktor Stavropol and the Polish national team.

He was chosen to participate at the 2016 Summer Olympics in Rio de Janeiro, in the men's handball tournament, but failed to make it to the final squad.

References

1995 births
Living people
Polish male handball players
Sportspeople from Płock